Waze & Odyssey are a British electronic music duo consisting of Serge Santiago and Firas Waez.

In 2014, the duo had a top 3 UK chart hit in the UK with their remix of 1994 single "Bump n' Grind". The track went on to sell over 400,000 copies worldwide.

In 2020, the pair released a bootleg version of George Michael & Mary J Blige's cover of Stevie Wonder's Always via Sony Records. All parties gave their blessing to the re-work and George Michael makes a cameo in the official music video. 

Forming in 2011, the duo came to early prominence after releasing on labels such as Wolf Music, Let's Play House, Tsuba and Throne of Blood. In 2012 made their European DJ debut at Berghain nightclub in Panorama Bar, Berlin. The pair have gone on to tour the world extensively, playing across the world's leading electronic festivals and events. They have gone on to release music  on labels for Green Velvet, Eats Everything and Jamie Jones, among others.

Waze & Odyssey head their own record label, W&O Street Tracks, which has seen releases from Groove Armada, Will Easton, Vonda7, Kill Frenzy, Lancelot, XXXY, Eliphino, Citizenn and Ejeca. The label has received plaudits from XL Recordings and Feel My Bicep Blog 

Waze & Odyssey's sound brings together house music, techno and disco influences.

Musical career

As producers
The pairing have released records on Wolf Music, petFood, Hottrax, Edible, Relief Records, Crosstown Rebels, Disco Bloodbath, Lets Play House, Tsuba, Throne of Bloody, and their own label W&O Street Tracks.

In 2012, they were nominated for Best Breakthrough Producers at the DJ Mag Awards.

They have also remixed a wide spectrum of artists such as Totally Enormous Extinct Dinosaurs, Ejeca, Disclosure and Duke Dumont.

As DJs
Waze & Odyssey have toured extensively across the world. They have played many of the world's biggest and most influential clubs such as Panorama Bar (Berghain), Fabric, The Warehouse Project, Amnesia and at festivals including Hideout, Glastonbury, EXIT Festival, Bestival, and Secret Garden Party.

They have received significant support from BBC Radio 1’s Pete Tong, Annie Mac & Danny Howard

In February 2015, they were invited to do the BBC Radio 1 Essential Mix.

They've featured on Boiler Room twice, first time in 2013 in Berlin where they made their debut alongside Tyree Cooper, Kyodai & DoP

In 2015 they were invited back to takeover Boiler Room in London with their label Street Tracks with label acts Neville Watson, Lancelot & Nummer

W&O Street Tracks
In 2012, Waze & Odyssey started their own label W&O Street Tracks, releasing across vinyl and digital formats.

As well as releasing their own music, the duo have championed the likes of Sage Caswell, Ejeca, Citizenn and XXXY, Lancelot, Kill Frenzy.

The label has seen support from the likes of Maya Jane Coles, Dusky, Mr G, Agoria, Huxley, Eats Everything & more.

"Bump & Grind 2014"
In late 2011, the duo created a bootleg containing R. Kelly's "Bump n' Grind" and MK's version of "Push the Feeling On" by Nightcrawlers to play in a DJ set. Having played it to Skream, he then requested a copy and the track took on a life of its own, going on to receive heavy club support across the UK and abroad from the likes of DJ EZ, Horse Meat Disco, Duke Dumont & more.

In 2013, Sony Records approached the duo to release the record. The track released by RCA sold over 200,000 copies in the UK alone and became a number 3 hit, attaining a higher first chart placing than the original record. The track featured an official remix from Paul Woolford (DJ) under his Special Request alias.

"Always"
In 2020, the duo made a comeback with the release of a revamped version of George Michael and Mary J Blige's 1999 cover of the Stevie Wonder classic "As", together with Tommy Theo. The song was released under the title of "Always" and was given the seal of approval from all artists for the first time in musical history, with both George and Mary listed as credited artists.

Discography

Singles

As lead artist

Singles/EPs

Remixes

References

British house musicians
British house music duos
House DJs